This is a chronological list of films produced in the United Kingdom split by decade. There may be an overlap, particularly between British and American films which are sometimes co-produced; the list should attempt to document films which are either British produced or strongly associated with British culture. Please see the detailed A-Z of films currently covered on Wikipedia at :Category:British films.

1888-1919

1920s

1930s

1940s

1950s

1960s

1970s

1980s

1990s

2000s

2010s

2020s

External links

 Internet Movie Database
 Britmovie, British film and cinema